The koukoulion (Greek: κουκούλιον; Slavonic: kukol) is a traditional headdress worn by monks and certain patriarchs in Eastern Christianity.

History 
Related to the western cowl, it was the cap worn by Orthodox monks. It is shown worn by emperors Michael IV, who died as a monk, in the Madrid Skylitzes. Medieval orthodox monks did not have specific habits and uniforms related to the orders as in the West (for example the Benedictine habit or Franciscan habit), but each monastery set its own rules. The monks wore a simple cap, often made of coarse and modest fabrics, that was called koukoulion.Great Schema

From the 17th century, following the reforms of Patriarch Nikon, the upper vesture worn by monks of the Great Schema (skhimonakh) is in the form of a pointed hood with two long lappets which cover the back and breast. It is black in color, and embroidered with crosses, six-winged seraphim, and the text of the Trisagion. It is worn above the mandyas (monastic mantle), and is the same for both monks and nuns.  In the context of monastic vows, it is called the koukoulion of kindliness, and the helmet of salvation. The koukoulion replaces the klobuk which is worn by the monastics of lower ranks. It fastened to a black veil, the Epanokalimavkion.

Patriarchal koukoulion 
Patriarch of Moscow 

The Patriarch of Moscow and all Russia wears a white klobuk, which is referred to as koukoulion, with a "Zion", a stiffened point topped by a cross. He wears this ex officio, whether or not he has been tonsured into the Great Schema. 

The origin of the white patriarchal koukoulion is disputed.

Archbishop Vasilii Kalika, Archbishop of Novgorod (1330–1352), wore a white koukoulion which is preserved in the Cathedral of St. Sophia, Novgorod. The Legend of the White Cowl is a Russian Orthodox story first recorded by the monk Philotheus of Pskov in 1510 that tells the story of how the white koukoulion was first given to the Archbishop Vasilii Kalika by the Ecumenical Patriarch. In 1667, the story was condemned by the Great Moscow Synod as "false and wrong" and as constructed by Dmitry Tolmach (different experts understand by this name either Dmitry Trakhaniot , or Dmitry Gerasimov, both of them bore this nickname).

Instead, Metropolitan Platon, based on the fact that earlier than Vasili of Novgorod the white kobluk had been worn by first  wore a white klobuk, hypothesized that the custom of the white klobuk was borrowed not from Novgorod, but existed before from the very beginning of Christianity in Russia. In addition, also Theodore I (990/992 - c. 1023), Isaiah (1078-1090), Leontiy (c.1051-c.1077), Ignatius bishops of Rostov are depicted wearing the white koukoulion as well as Maximos, Metropolitan of all Rus' (1283–1305) and Peter (c. 1260-1326), Jonah (-1461), and Alexius of Moscow (1296–1378) and Vasilii Kalika (1330-352), Moses, and Alexy of Novgorod. In the 1380s frescoes in Volotovo Church, Moses and Alexy are depicted wearing a white koukoulion with crosses. This suggest an early adoption of this garment instead. Other evidence, such as the images in the Svyatoslav's Miscellanies and later chrnociles such as Nikon Chronicle and the documents from the 1564 council, also suggest that white headgear was an ancient tradition in Russian lands and predated the 1300s adoption by Vasilii and his successors in Novgorod.

In 1564, the Moscow Council adopted a code on the right of the Moscow metropolitan to wear a white koukoulion. After the establishment of the patriarchate in Russia in 1589, the Moscow patriarchs began to wear the white koukoulion.

Other

Koukoulia are also worn by the primates of certain other Orthodox churches, for example the Catholicos-Patriarch of All Georgia.

Josyf Slipyj, Major Archbishop of the Ukrainian Greek Catholic Church, wore a red koukoulian, when made a cardinal of the Catholic Church at the consistory of 1965.

See also
Klobuk
Skufia
Apostolnik
Cowl
Epanokamelavkion
Kalimavkion
The Philippi Collection

References

Hats
Headgear
Eastern Christian vestments
Christian monasticism
Russian Orthodox Church in Russia
Eastern Orthodox liturgy